Wayne Township is one of the fourteen townships of Auglaize County, Ohio, United States. The 2010 census found 1,594 people in the township of whom some 747 lived in the unincorporated portions of the township.

Geography
Located in the northeastern part of the county it borders the following townships:
Auglaize Township, Allen County - north
Marion Township, Hardin County - northeast corner
Roundhead Township, Hardin County - east
Goshen Township - south
Union Township - west
Perry Township, Allen County - northwest corner

The village of Waynesfield is located in southwestern Wayne Township.

Name and history
It is named for General "Mad" Anthony Wayne and is one of twenty Wayne Townships statewide.

The township was formed in either 1834 or 1836  while still part of Allen County.

Government
The township is governed by a three-member board of trustees who are elected in November of odd-numbered years to four-year terms beginning the next January 1. Two trustees are elected in the year after the presidential election and one is elected in the year before it.

The township fiscal officer is elected in November of the year before the presidential election. The officer serves a four-year term beginning the next April 1. Vacancies on the board of trustees or in the fiscal office are filled by the remaining trustees.

Public services
Children in Wayne Township attend schools of the Waynesfield-Goshen Local School District except in the southeast corner of the township where they are served by the Upper Scioto Valley Local School District.

The township is served by the Waynesfield (zip code 45896) post office except for two small sections served by the Wapakoneta (45895) post office and the Harrod (45850) post office.

References

External links
Auglaize County website

Townships in Auglaize County, Ohio
Townships in Ohio
1830s establishments in Ohio